Çağşak is a village in the Mudurnu District, Bolu Province, Turkey. Its population is 118 (2021).

References

Villages in Mudurnu District